Fluting in architecture consists of shallow grooves running along a surface.

The term typically refers to the grooves (flutes) running vertically on a column shaft or a pilaster, but need not necessarily be restricted to those two applications. If the hollowing out of material meets in a point, the point (sharp ridge) is called an arris.

Purpose 
Fluting promotes a play of light on a column which helps the column appear more perfectly round than a smooth column. As a strong vertical element it also has the visual effect of minimizing any horizontal joints.

Greek architects viewed rhythm as an important design element. As such, fluting was often used on buildings and temples to increase the sense of rhythm. It may also be incorporated in columns to make them look thinner, lighter, and more elegant.

There is debate as to whether fluting was originally used in imitation of ancient woodworking practices, mimicking adze marks on wooden columns made from tree trunks, or whether it was designed to imitate plant forms. Either way, it was not invented by the Greeks of the classical period who popularized it, but rather passed down or learned from the Mycenaeans or the Egyptians.

Maximilian armour, a style of German plate armour, used fluting as a means to imitate the pleated clothing that was fashionable at the time. The fluting may also have helped to deflect weapon strikes during a fight, and to increase the structural strength of the plates.

Applications 
Fluted columns styled under the Doric order of architecture have 20 flutes. Ionic, Corinthian, and Composite columns traditionally have 24. Fluting is never used on Tuscan order columns.

Fluting is always applied exclusively to the shaft of the column, and may run either the entire shaft length from the base to the capital, or only on the upper two thirds of the column shaft. The latter application is used to complement the entasis of the column, which begins one third of the way up from the bottom of the shaft.

Fluting might be applied to freestanding, structural columns, as well as engaged columns and decorative pilasters.

Cabled fluting 
If the flutes (hollowed-out grooves) are partly re-filled with moulding, this form of decorated fluting is cabled fluting, ribbed fluting, rudenture, stopped fluting or stop-fluting. Cabling refers to this or cable molding. 
When this occurs in columns, it is on roughly the lower third of the grooves. This decorative element is not used in Doric order columns. Cabled fluting may have been used to prevent wear and damage to the sharp edges of the flutes along the bottom part of the column.

Examples

Classical architecture 
While Greek temples employed columns for load-bearing purposes, Roman architects used columns more often as decorative elements. Fluting was used in both Greek and Roman architecture.

Persian architecture 
Persian-style columns do not follow the Classical orders, but were developed during the Achaemenid Empire in ancient Persia. These columns are usually characterized as fluted columns with long capitals featuring two highly decorated animals. Examples can be most clearly seen in the ruins of Persepolis, Iran.

Egyptian architecture 
One of the earliest remaining examples of fluting in columns can be seen at Djoser's necropolis in Saqqara, built by Imhotep in the 27th century BC. These columns are made of limestone and used fluting with the intention of looking like bundles of plant stems.

Renaissance architecture 
Renaissance architecture, built between the 14th and 17th centuries in Europe, centered on a revival of classical architectural elements, including Classical order columns.

Neoclassical architecture 
The Neoclassical is a Classical revival beginning in the 18th century and continuing today. This style is exemplified throughout many government buildings and monuments in the United States, as it was popular during the American Revolution.

See also 
 Fluting (geology)
Solomonic column
Gadrooning: the opposite of fluting
 Reeding: the opposite of fluting
Molding (decorative)

References

External links
University of Pittsburgh - "fluting" from the Medieval Art and Architecture glossary

Architectural elements